Rimantas ("Rimas") Žvingilas (born 3 September 1973) is a Lithuanian former international football striker. He has played in his home country, in Belgium, in several clubs in Russia, and in Kazakhstan.

He retired on 7 July 2009.

Žvingilas made 25 appearances for the Lithuania national football team between 1995 and 2001.

On 25 November 2010, Žvingilas was appointed head coach at Norwegian Division 3 team Bergsøy IL. His contract was terminated by mutual consent on 24 April 2011. A press release cited that Zvilingas wanted to spend more time with his family as the reason.

Honours
 Baltic Cup
 1996

References

 

1973 births
Living people
Sportspeople from Klaipėda
Lithuanian footballers
Lithuania international footballers
Lithuanian expatriate footballers
Lithuanian football managers
Lithuanian expatriate football managers
FK Sirijus Klaipėda players
FK Atlantas players
FK Kareda Kaunas players
FC Torpedo Moscow players
FC Dynamo Saint Petersburg players
FC Shakhter Karagandy players
FBK Kaunas footballers
Association football forwards
A Lyga players
Belgian Pro League players
Russian Premier League players
Kazakhstan Premier League players
FK Atlantas managers
Expatriate footballers in Belgium
Lithuanian expatriate sportspeople in Belgium
Expatriate footballers in Russia
Lithuanian expatriate sportspeople in Russia
Expatriate footballers in Kazakhstan
Lithuanian expatriate sportspeople in Kazakhstan
Expatriate football managers in Norway
Lithuanian expatriate sportspeople in Norway
K.R.C. Zuid-West-Vlaanderen players